Polaris K-12 School is a lottery-entry magnet school serving grades Kindergarten through 12th grade in Anchorage, Alaska. It serves the Anchorage School District.

Student Government 
The Polaris student government Is not a typical student government model consisting of a president, a vice president, etc., but is run by an operational board, or op. board, consisting of four Senior Operational Board Members (Juniors/Seniors), two High School Student Advisory Board Positions (High Schoolers), four Junior Operational Board Positions (9th-10th Graders),two Middle School Mentees (6th-8th Graders), and Middle School Student Advisory Board Positions (6th-8th Graders).

Programs
In addition to typical programs found in schools serving its grade levels, Polaris's other programs include:
 Intensives - 2-week courses which allow students to study topics not offered in a typical school curriculum. These are offered at the beginning of the school year, after winter break, and at the end of the school year.
 The Habitat - an outdoor learning environment.

Tent City Project
On February 27, 2015, the school celebrated Anchorage's 100th anniversary with a "tent city". The project was initiated by two students who wondered what life in Anchorage was like in 1915.

Alaska State Dog
Polaris School students were instrumental in having the Alaskan malamute designated as Alaska's official state dog. Over a three-year period, students did research and testified before the state legislature.

References

External links

Public K-12 schools in Alaska
Anchorage School District
Magnet schools in Alaska